Known as Vera Felicidade - Vera Felicidade de Almeida Campos, Irará, Bahia, August 18, 1942, is a Brazilian psychologist who founded Gestalt Psychotherapy, a psychotherapeutic theory based on Gestalt Psychology. From gestalt and phenomenology she developed a clinical practice and a theory that supports it, breaking with psychoanalytic concepts that influence virtually all approaches to clinical psychology, even gestalt approaches. Gestalt Psychotherapy (a term coined by Vera Felicidade to name her theory) is different from Gestalt Therapy (developed by Fritz Perls). The difference is in the methodology as well as in the theoretical basis, especially regarding the unconscious, a concept accepted by F. Perls and denied by Vera Felicidade. The clinical practice is individual and based on dialogue between psychotherapist and client. Her eleven books expose the development of the theory's concepts, such as: to perceive is to know; psychological life is perceptive life; the human being is a possibility of relationship; non-acceptance; autoreferencing etc.

Biography

Early life and education

Vera Felicidade was born in the small town of Irará in the state of Bahia, Brazil. She is the first daughter of the couple Aristeu Nogueira Campos and Odete de Almeida Campos, and at the age of three, the family moved to the capital, Salvador, where she grew up, studied and started her university education, remaining in the city until the age of eighteen. She graduated in psychology in Rio de Janeiro and since then has been dedicated to clinical practice and the development of Gestalt Psychotherapy theory as presented in her published books.

Creation of Gestalt Psychotherapy

While doing her psychology course at the Federal University of Rio de Janeiro (UFRJ), Vera felt dissatisfied with the existing theories in the field of Clinical Psychology. She already had work experience in psychiatric hospitals in Brazil (Juliano Moreira Hospital) and courses in Moscow at the Department of Medicine of the Patrice Lumumba Russian University (The Peoples' Friendship University of Russia) in 1962, and due to her philosophical background and interest in theory studies, she has always had an epistemological concern making clear in her writings the inconsistencies and contradictions of authors who intend to develop a psychotherapy based on Gestalt Psychology, but continue assuming concepts from the psychoanalytic theoretical matrix. For her, the visions of man implicit in psychoanalysis (Freud) and in Gestalt Psychology are incompatible. Even before entering UFRJ, she knew the work of the researchers and theorists of Gestalt Psychology, Koffka, Koehler and Wertheimer, and their research on perception and sensation, laws of perception, isomorphism, etc. She was also aware of the research of Kurt Lewin and his Field Theory, and therefore had a criticism of the dualistic approach and the Class Theory-based approach, which are characteristic of psychoanalysis, behaviorism, and other functionalist schools in psychology.

The German Gestaltists did not develop a psychotherapy. This work needed to be done and Vera Felicidade, benefited both by Gestalt concepts and by Phenomenology - Edmund Husserl - started the development of Gestalt Psychotherapy, a term coined by her. Her theory is based exclusively on gestaltism, phenomenology, and dialectical materialism. At no time does she make use of psychoanalytic concepts, as does, for instance, Fritz Perls’ Gestalt Therapy. One of the ideas most combated by Vera Felicidade, because it is the most widespread not only in psychology but also in several other areas of knowledge, is the idea of the existence of the unconscious. The concept of the unconscious in Freud's work is the heart of psychoanalysis. It is a fundamental concept with implications in the approach and way of thinking about man, his psychism and his behaviour. With the great dissemination of psychoanalysis after World War II, this was one of its most widespread concepts not only in the human sciences but for the lay public, the common sense. Vera, since her first book, expresses her denial of the unconscious in a chapter entitled O Mito do Inconsciente (“The Myth of the Unconscious”).

Vera Felicidade works in clinical psychology since the late 1960s and has been consistently developing her theory in her many books, articles, and research reports for decades, from the first book published in 1972 to the most recent ones published in 2015 and 2017, respectively (Linguagem e Psicoterapia Gestaltista - Como se Aprende a Falar, Ideias & Letras, São Paulo; Como Perceber e Transformar a Neurose, Simplíssimo, Porto Alegre), several of them cataloged in the Library of Congress in Washington (USA) and other public libraries. Her books are also found in Libraries of American Universities (Yale and Harvard), as well as in Libraries of Brazilian Universities (University of Brasilia - UnB and others ) and in the National Library (Rio de Janeiro). In addition to books, she regularly publishes articles in magazines and journals.

Published books
Psicoterapia Gestaltista - Conceituações,  Edição da Autora, Rio de Janeiro-RJ, 1972
Mudança e Psicoterapia Gestaltista, Zahar Editores, Rio de Janeiro-RJ, 1978
Individualidade, Questionamento e Psicoterapia Gestaltista,  Editora Alhambra, Rio de Janeiro-RJ, 1983
Relacionamento - Trajetória do Humano, Edição da Autora, Salvador-BA, 1988
Terra e Ouro são Iguais - Percepção em Psicoterapia Gestaltista, Jorge Zahar Editor, Rio de Janeiro-RJ, 1993
Desespero e Maldade - Estudos  Perceptivos - Relação  Figura/Fundo, Edição da Autora, Salvador-BA, 1999
A Questão do Ser, do Si Mesmo e do Eu, Relume Dumará, Rio de Janeiro - RJ, 2002
Mãe Stella de Oxóssi – Perfil de uma Liderança Religiosa, Jorge Zahar Editor, Rio de Janeiro-RJ, 2003
A realidade da ilusão, a ilusão da realidade, Relume Dumará, Rio de Janeiro – RJ, 2004
Linguagem e Psicoterapia Gestaltista - Como se Aprende a Falar, Ideias & Letras, São Paulo - SP, 2015
Como Perceber e Transformar a Neurose - Psicoterapia Gestaltista, Simplíssimo (eBook), Porto Alegre-RS, 2017

References

External links
Official Site
Books released in digital format - eBooks
Library of Congress Catalog Record
Dr. Paulo Queiroz - Why do we kill our parents
Yale University Library, Catalog
Interview with Vera Felicidade in the newspapers: A Tarde, Correio da Bahia e Bahia Hoje - Salvador-BA
Amazon.com - Books by Vera Felicidade
Institute of Psychology of the Federal University of Bahia (UFBA), Optional subjects of the psychology course: Código: FCH397  Disciplina: Psicoterapia Gestaltista de Vera Felicidade - Pré requisito: FCH046
Institute of Psychology of the Federal University of Bahia (UFBA), Mandatory Subject Teorias e Sistemas Psicológicos II has in its programmatic content Psicoterapia Gestaltista-VeraFelicidade

People associated with Federal University of Rio de Janeiro
Federal University of Rio de Janeiro alumni
Brazilian psychologists
Brazilian women psychologists
1942 births